Hans-Jürgen "Dixie" Dörner (25 January 1951 – 19 January 2022) was a German football player and coach. He distinguished himself during his career by being named East Germany's player of the year three times (1977, 1984 and 1985) – the only East German player to do this besides goalkeeper Jürgen Croy.

Playing career
Dörner's playing career began in 1960 with amateur club BSG Energie WAMA Görlitz. He joined Dynamo Dresden in 1968 where he won five first division DDR-Oberliga titles and five FDGB-Pokale (East German Cup), twice winning the DDR-Oberliga and FDGB-Pokal double. He captained Dynamo Dresden from 1977 until his retirement, and is the club's most decorated captain. He was voted the team's greatest player ever in 1999.

During his time at Dynamo Dresden, the club finished outside the top three in the DDR-Oberliga only once, which was a seventh place finish in the 1982–83 season.

He captained the team to their best European seasons, twice reaching the quarter finals of the European Clubs' Champions Cup in 1977 and 1979. He also guided his team to quarter finals in the 1975–76 UEFA Cup and both the 1984–85 and the 1985–86 UEFA Cup Winners' Cup. This was seen as a great success against teams from Europe's big leagues. Dörner scored an amazing 65 goals in 392 top-flight games for Dynamo Dresden, a record for a defender in the DDR-Oberliga.

He was capped 96 times for East Germany, winning a gold medal as a vital part of that country's Olympic team at the 1976 Montreal Olympics.

Coaching career
His career as a player ended in 1986, and he later took on the role of trainer for the East German Olympic squad in 1990. After German re-unification, he coached the Olympic youth side of the united country. From 6 January 1996 until 20 August 1997 he was the coach for Bundesliga club Werder Bremen. From 2006 to 2010 he coached Radebeuler BC 08 in the city league known as the Bezirksliga Dresden.

Death
Dörner died on 19 January 2022, at the age of 70.

Honours
Dynamo Dresden
 DDR-Oberliga: 1970–71, 1972–73, 1975–76, 1976–77, 1977–78; runner-up: 1978–79, 1979–80, 1981–82, 1983–84, 1984–85
 FDGB-Pokal: 1970–71, 1976–77, 1981–82, 1983–84, 1984–85

See also
 List of men's footballers with 100 or more international caps

References

External links
 

1951 births
2022 deaths
People from Görlitz
German footballers
Footballers from Saxony
East German footballers
Association football defenders
East Germany international footballers
FIFA Century Club
DDR-Oberliga players
Dynamo Dresden players
Dynamo Dresden II players
Olympic medalists in football
Olympic gold medalists for East Germany
Medalists at the 1976 Summer Olympics
Footballers at the 1976 Summer Olympics
Olympic footballers of East Germany
East German football managers
German football managers
Bundesliga managers
SV Werder Bremen managers
1. FC Lokomotive Leipzig managers
Dynamo Dresden non-playing staff
FSV Zwickau managers
German expatriate football managers
German expatriate sportspeople in Egypt
Expatriate football managers in Egypt
People from Bezirk Dresden